Andrew Paul Selfridge (January 12, 1949 – June 28, 2019) was an American football linebacker in the National Football League for the Buffalo Bills, New York Giants, and the Miami Dolphins.  He played college football at the University of Virginia and was drafted in the 13th round of the 1972 NFL Draft by the San Diego Chargers.

After his football career, Selfridge worked in fundraising at the University of Virginia. He died on June 28, 2019, in Charlottesville, Virginia at the age of 70.

References

1949 births
2019 deaths
American football linebackers
Buffalo Bills players
Miami Dolphins players
New York Giants players
Players of American football from Cleveland
Virginia Cavaliers football players